Olivia Smith may refer:

 Olivia Smith (soccer), Canadian soccer player
 Olivia Smith (journalist), American journalist